The following is a list of squads for each nation competing at the 2014 European Women's Handball Championship.

On 7 November 2014 every coach had to submit a list of a maximum of 28 players, whom which 16 were selected for the final tournament.

The final squads were revealed on 6 and 7 December 2014 at the technical meetings.

Group A

Hungary
Head coach: András Németh

A 16-player squad was announced on 24 November 2014.

Poland
Head coach:  Kim Rasmussen

The squad was announced on 4 December 2014.

Russia
Head coach: Yevgeni Trefilov

The squad was announced on 27 November 2014 with changes made on 4 December 2014.

Spain
Head coach: Jorge Dueñas

An 18-player squad was announced on 5 November 2014. The final squad was announced on 5 December 2014.

Group B

Denmark
Head coach: Jan Pytlick

A 15-player squad was announced on 27 October 2014. The final squad was revealed on 29 November 2014
and announced on 3 December 2014.
Squad was approved on 7 December 2014

Norway
Head coach: Thorir Hergeirsson

A 12-player preliminary squad was announced on 11 November 2014. The final roster was announced on 21 November 2014. Ida Bjørndalen replaced Linn Jørum Sulland due to an injury on 30 November 2014. Emily Stang Sando replaced Kari Aalvik Grimsbø due to an injury on 8 December 2014.

Romania
Head coach: Gheorghe Tadici

A 17-player squad was announced on 11 November 2014, which was made 18 on 25 November 2014.
Changes were made on 5 December 2014. On 11 December 2014 Adriana Nechita was replaced by Aneta Pîrvuț.

Ukraine
Head coach: Leonid Ratner

Group C

Croatia
Head coach: Vladimir Canjuga

An 18-player squad was announced on 25 November 2014.

Germany
Head coach:  Heine Jensen

A 19-player squad was announced on 13 November 2014. 17 players were left on 1 December 2014.
The final squad was announced on 3 December 2014.

Netherlands
Head coach: Henk Groener

The squad was announced on 28 November 2014.

Sweden
Head coach: Tomas Sivertsson /  Helle Thomsen

The squad was announced on 12 November 2014.

Group D

France
Head coach: Alain Portes

An 18-player squad was announced on 1 December 2014.

Montenegro
Head coach: Dragan Adžić

A 16-player squad was announced on 18 November 2014.

Serbia
Head coach: Saša Bošković

Slovakia
Head coach: Dušan Poloz

An 18-player squad was announced on 30 October 2014.

References

External links
Official website

squads
European Handball Championship squads